Redcliffe Gardens School is a private school for girls and boys aged 2 to 11 located at two separate sites in Chelsea. The pre-prep is located in Redcliffe Square, the prep school is located in Redcliffe Gardens. Since September 2020 the school has been part of the Godolphin and Latymer Foundation.

History
Redcliffe School was founded in 1948 by Lady Dorothy May Edwards and from 1973 carried on by the charity Redcliffe School Trust Limited.

Alumni
Daniel Radcliffe, actor.

Jemima Rooper, the actress, also attended primary school here before leaving a year prior her eleven plus examinations and then went to Godolphin Latymer School in Hammersmith. She was two years above Daniel Redcliffe.

Emerald Fennell, actress, the eldest daughter of the jewellery mogul Theo Fennell attended primary school here. Emerald was a year below Jemima Rooper. Emerald's younger sister Coco now a fashion designer and beautician was in the same year as Daniel Radcliffe. Coco also attended this primary school. Both Fennel daughters stayed until they were twelve years old and have gone on to forge successful and varied careers. Emerald Fennell won the Oscar for Best Original Screenplay in April 2021 - her talent was previously spotted at Redcliffe School when she won the Redcliffe School creative writing award in 1997!

References

External links
 School website

1948 establishments in England
Educational institutions established in 1948
Private co-educational schools in London
Private schools in the Royal Borough of Kensington and Chelsea
Preparatory schools in London